The Theodore Roosevelt Expressway (also known as the National Highway System High Priority Corridor 58), is made up of several existing highways between Rapid City, South Dakota and the Port of Raymond between Saskatchewan and Montana. It is the northern third of the Ports-to-Plains Alliance. Congress designated the route as one of 80 National Highway System High-Priority Corridors in 2005 by the Intermodal Surface Transportation Efficiency Act. The designation did not create new design standards or create new eligibility for any additional federal funding.

The route begins in Rapid City, South Dakota and runs north on U.S. Route 85 to Williston, North Dakota. From Williston, the route turns west on U.S. Route 2 to Culbertson, Montana where it turns north on Montana Highway 16 to the Canada–US border at Raymond, Montana. The expressway takes its name from former President of the United States Theodore Roosevelt.

South Dakota
Through South Dakota, the route runs  from Rapid City to the North Dakota state line. The route runs concurrent with Interstate 90/U.S. Route 14 from Rapid City at an interchange with Interstate 190/U.S. Route 16 west through Sturgis en route to Spearfish where it turns north onto U.S. 85. The route then continues in a northerly direction through Belle Fourche, Redig, Buffalo and Ludlow en route to the North Dakota state line.

North Dakota
Through North Dakota, the route runs  from the South Dakota state line to the Montana state line. After crossing the state line, the highway continues north along U.S. 85 through Bowman, Amidon, Belfield (where it intersects Interstate 94), Fairfield, Grassy Butte, Watford City and Alexander before its junction with U.S. 2 just west of Williston. The route then parallels U.S. 2 to the Montana state line.

Montana
Through Montana, the route runs  from the North Dakota state line to the Canada–US border. After crossing the state line, the route continues west along U.S. 2 through Bainville en route to Culbertson. In Culbertson the route turns north along Montana Highway 16 through Froid, Medicine Lake, Antelope, Plentywood and Raymond before ending at the Port of Raymond.

References

External links

Theodore Roosevelt Expressway
TRED Study from the Montana DOT

 
Transportation in Rapid City, South Dakota
Expressways in the United States
Roads in North Dakota
Roads in Montana
U.S. Route 2
U.S. Route 85
2005 establishments in the United States
Interstate 90
U.S. Route 14